Massive Wagons are a British rock band from Lancaster founded in 2009.

The band are currently signed to Nottingham-based independent record label Earache Records (having inked their deal in October 2017) and in 2018 released their fourth studio album Full Nelson, in doing so securing a Top 20 album in the UK Albums Chart, peaking at number 16.

The band caused controversy in their home town of Lancaster by erecting a large mural of their new album cover on the side of a pub wall. Initially condemned by the local council due to not having the relevant planning permissions, public outcry led to the council dramatically reversing their decision and allowing the art to stay.

Following the release of Full Nelson in the summer of 2018 the band went on to play at Download Festival and also open for Status Quo at Kendal Rugby Club.

They cite their influences as being artists such as Status Quo, UFO, Rainbow and Slade amongst others.

History 
Formed in 2009, the band remained nameless until their first gig was booked and they needed a name to perform under. Jokingly adopting the temporary moniker of 'Massive Wagons', the playful nickname of a local barmaid, the band eventually stuck with it and it remains to this day.

The band's initial commercial release, entitled "Sniff The Riff", was self-released but by the time their debut LP Fire It Up came along in 2012 the band had signed to London-based independent label Casket Music.

in 2013 the band entered a UK Battle of the Bands competition entitled 'Highway To Hell'. Having won the competition the band went on to sign a multi-album contract with Ibiza-based independent label 'Off Yer Rocka'. Their second studio album, Fight The System, was released in 2014 on Off Yer Rocka and a live/rarities album, The Good The Bad And The Ugly, was released in late 2015.

Returning to the studio in April 2016, Massive Wagons recorded their third studio long player, Welcome To The World, which featured singles "Tokyo" and "Ratio". Welcome To The World saw the band's first chart success, entering the iTunes Top 100 charts in several territories. Later that year the band went on to support The Wildhearts on a national UK tour.

In 2017 the band released a charity single for the Teenage Cancer Trust entitled "Back To The Stack", notable as a tribute to Rick Parfitt of Status Quo. Rick Parfitt Jnr, son of the late Rick Parfitt, has since publicly acknowledged his support of the track. Late 2017 saw the band's first line-up change, with Stephen Holl replacing Carl Cochrane on rhythm guitar.

In June 2019, the band embarked on their first arena tour in the UK, as opening act for Lynyrd Skynyrd's "Last of the Street Survivors" farewell tour. The tour comprised four dates at major UK arenas: SSE Hydro in Glasgow, Manchester Arena, London's Wembley Arena, and Resorts World Arena Birmingham

Massive Wagons ended their Road Dogs tour on 7 December at Gorilla in Manchester, with support from Bootyard Bandits, a country metal band from Gloucestershire. The band played a song called Hero from their fifth studio album, which the band recorded in early 2020. The album, House of Noise, was released July 17, 2020 and charted at number 9 in the UK album charts.

Discography

Studio albums
 Fire It Up (Casket Music, 2012)
 Fight the System (Off Yer Rocka, 2014)
 Welcome to the World (Off Yer Rocka, 2016)
 Full Nelson (Earache, 10 August 2018)
 House of Noise (Earache, 17 July 2020)
 Triggered! (Earache, 2022)

Live/rarities albums
 The Good The bad and The ugly (Off Yer Rocka, 2015)

References

English rock music groups